The 1983–84 Connecticut Huskies men's basketball team represented the University of Connecticut in the 1983–84 collegiate men's basketball season. The Huskies completed the season with a 13–15 overall record. The Huskies were members of the Big East Conference where they finished with a 5–11 record. The Huskies played their home games at Hugh S. Greer Field House in Storrs, Connecticut and the Hartford Civic Center in Hartford, Connecticut and were led by seventh-year head coach Dom Perno.

Schedule 

|-
!colspan=12 style=""| Regular Season

|-
!colspan=12 style=""| Big East tournament

Schedule Source:

References 

UConn Huskies men's basketball seasons
Connecticut Huskies
1983 in sports in Connecticut
1984 in sports in Connecticut